Harold Masursky (1922–1990) was an American astrogeologist.

Masursky may also refer to:
 Masursky (Martian crater), a crater on Mars
 2685 Masursky, an asteroid
 Masursky Award, an award for meritorious service to planetary science